Carapinheira is a town in Portugal. The population in 2011 was 2,898, in an area of 15.90 km².

References

Freguesias of Montemor-o-Velho